Brookdale is the name of many settlements, institutions, and businesses in English-speaking countries.

Cities and towns
 Brookdale, California, an unincorporated town in Santa Cruz County
 Brookdale, Kansas
 Brookdale, Manitoba, an unincorporated town in the municipality of North Cypress, Canada
 Brookdale, New Jersey, an unincorporated community in Bloomfield, New Jersey
 Brookdale, South Carolina, a census-designated place in Orangeburg County
 Brookdale, Western Australia, a small suburb in the city of Armadale
 Brookdale, New South Wales, a rural locality in the Riverina region

Other
 Brookdale Center, a defunct mall in Brooklyn Center, Minnesota
 Brookdale Community College, Lincroft, New Jersey
 Brookdale Park, New Jersey, a county park
 Brookdale Senior Living, a U.S. company that operates senior residences
 Brookdale University Hospital and Medical Center, Brooklyn, New York